2018 Kagoshima United FC season.

J3 League

References

External links
 J.League official site

Kagoshima United FC
Kagoshima United FC seasons